Tania Fernandes Anderson (born January 4, 1979) is a Cape Verdean-born American politician and non-profit executive who is a Member of the Boston City Council for the 7th district. A Democrat, she was elected in 2021 to succeed Kim Janey and represents Roxbury, Dorchester, and part of the South End. She is the first practicing Muslim elected to the Council.

Early life and career
Fernandes Anderson was born in Praia, Cape Verde, where she was raised by her closeted uncle and moved to Roxbury when she was 10. She graduated from John D. O'Bryant High School. She is the executive director of Bowdoin Geneva Main Streets, a non-profit supporting small businesses.

Boston City Council

Electoral history

Personal life
Fernandes Anderson has been a foster mom of 17 children. She is a practicing Sunni Muslim.

References

External links
 Campaign website

1979 births
Living people
21st-century American politicians
21st-century American women politicians
American people of Cape Verdean descent
American politicians of Cape Verdean descent
American Sunni Muslims
African-American Sunni Muslims
Boston City Council members
Cape Verdean expatriates in the United States
Women city councillors in Massachusetts